Juan Luis Fernández Redondo (born 17 January 1977) is a Spanish former professional footballer who played as a right back.

He amassed Segunda División totals of 275 matches and six goals over ten seasons, in representation of four clubs. In La Liga, he appeared for Betis, Sevilla and Xerez.

Club career
Redondo was born in Camas, Seville, Andalusia. During his professional career, spent mainly in the second division, he also had La Liga spells with both main clubs from Seville: he appeared in only two games late into the 1996–97 season with Real Betis, being regularly played by Sevilla FC in two of his three years but being released prior to their consecutive UEFA Cup exploits.

In the summer of 2007, after a couple of second-level campaigns with Hércules CF, the 30-year-old Redondo joined fellow league side Xerez CD, where he would be used almost exclusively as a backup, playing a total of only 39 matches over three seasons, the last spent in the top flight with relegation. Subsequently, he renewed his contract for a further year.

In June 2011, after making 33 appearances – 31 starts – to help to an eighth-place finish, Redondo left Xerez and retired from football the following year, after not being able to find a team.

Honours

Club
Xerez
Segunda División: 2008–09

International
Spain U18
UEFA European Under-18 Championship: 1995

References

External links

1977 births
Living people
People from Camas, Seville
Sportspeople from the Province of Seville
Spanish footballers
Footballers from Andalusia
Association football defenders
La Liga players
Segunda División players
Segunda División B players
Betis Deportivo Balompié footballers
Real Betis players
Hércules CF players
CD Logroñés footballers
Elche CF players
Sevilla FC players
Xerez CD footballers
Spain youth international footballers